Oswegatchie may refer to:

In New York
Oswegatchie, New York, a town in St. Lawrence County
Oswegatchie River, a tributary of the Saint Lawrence River
Oswegatchie people, a native people of northern New York
Fort Oswegatchie, subsequent name of Fort de La Présentation
Oswegatchie Corners, a location in the town of Diana, New York

Elsewhere
Oswegatchie Historic District, a location in the town of Waterford, Connecticut